is a regional radio and television service serving Nagoya, Aichi Prefecture, Japan. It is majorly owned by the Chunichi Shimbun.  Its radio service is affiliated with the Japan Radio Network (JRN) and its television service affiliated with the Japan News Network (JNN).

History

CBC was established in 1950 as Japan's first commercial radio broadcaster. Television broadcasts were introduced on December 1, 1956.

In 2013, the radio and television companies spun off. In 2013, Chūbu Nippon Hōsō as name is CBC Radio and in 2014, as name is CBC Television, his now this name is Chūbu Nippon Hōsō Holdings. And now, Chūbu Nippon Hōsō is the mame save, for now as Holdings and Group-holdings.

CBC also operates the C-Wave advertising agency.

Broadcasting

Radio
Frequency
Nagoya (from Nagashima, Mie Prefecture): 1053 kHz: JOAR (AM); 93.7 MHz (FM)
Gifu (from Kagamigahara, Gifu Prefecture): 639 kHz: JOAR
Kumano: 720 kHz: JOAR
Owase: 801 kHz: JOAR
Hida-Kamioka and Gero: 1062 kHz: JOAR
Toyohashi: 1485 kHz: JOAE
Iga-Ueno: 1485 kHz: JOAR
Takayama: 1557 kHz: JOAO
Nakatsugawa: 1557 kHz: JOAR
Shinshiro: 1557 kHz: JOAR

TV (Analog)
JOAR-TV (1956/12/1-2011/7/24)
Nagoya Main Station (Nagoya TV Tower) - Channel 5
Toyohashi - Channel 62
Toyota - Channel 55
Gujo - Channel 8
Gero - Channel 10
Chuno - Channel 62
Kumano - Channel 5
Owase - Channel 6
Ise - Channel 55
Nabari - Channel 60
Toba - Channel 10
Shima-Isobe - Channel 45
Hazu - Channel 41
Honyado - Channel 39
Akabane - Channel 36
Kihō Kaminouchi - Channel 35
Unumahōjakuji - Channel 40
Toyota Kugyūdaira - Channel 42
Komaki Momokadai - Channel 43
Nakatsugawa Kashimo - Channel 27
Toki Minami - Channel 34
Kihoarigawa - Channel 24
Shima Daioh Funoekobe Kita - Channel 38
Shima Daio Funoeko Minami - Channel 39
Toyota Inaba Takenishi - Channel 44
Kameyama Sekichō - Channel 48
Tajimi - Channel 53
Hidakamioka Nagareha - Channel 54
Hidakamioka - Channel 56
Nakatsugawa Tsukechi - Channel 57
Horai Ono Kita - Channel 61
Inabe Kitazume - Channel 62

TV (Digital)
JOGX-DTV (old former callsign: JOAR-DTV) (2003/12/01)
Remote Controller ID 5
Nagoya Main Starion (Seto Digital Tower) and Nabari - Channel 18
Toyohashi, Gamagori-Tahara, Chuno, Nakatsugawa, Nagara, Takayama and Ise - Channel 16

Other TV stations in Nagoya
Tokai TV (THK, affiliated with CX and FNN/FNS) - 1
Chukyo TV (CTV, affiliated with NTV and NNN/NNS) - 4
Metele (NBN, affiliated with TV Asahi and ANN) - 6
TV Aichi (TVA, affiliated with TV Tokyo and TX Network|TXN) - 10

External links
CBC Official Website

Japan News Network
Radio in Japan
Television stations in Nagoya
Radio stations established in 1951
Television channels and stations established in 1956
1951 establishments in Japan
Anime companies